Henry Bedford (born 1854) was an English cricketer who played for Hampshire. He was born in Canterbury.

Bedford made a single first-class appearance for the team, during the 1882 season, against Somerset. From the lower order, Bedford scored 3 runs in the only innings in which he batted, as Hampshire won the match by a ten-wicket margin.

External links
Henry Bedford at Cricket Archive 

1854 births
English cricketers
Hampshire cricketers
Year of death missing
Sportspeople from Canterbury